The men's 1000 metres in short track speed skating at the 1992 Winter Olympics took place from 18 to 20 February at the La halle de glace Olympique.

Results

Heats
The first round was held on 18 February. There were eight heats, with the top two finishers moving on to the quarterfinals.

Heat 1

Heat 2

Heat 3

Heat 4

Heat 5

Heat 6

Heat 7

Heat 8

Quarterfinals
The quarterfinals were held on 20 February. The top two finishers in each of the four quarterfinals advanced to the semifinals.

Quarterfinal 1

Quarterfinal 2

Quarterfinal 3

Quarterfinal 4

Semifinals
The semifinals were held on 20 February. The top two finishers in each of the two semifinals qualified for the A final, while the third and fourth place skaters advanced to the B Final.

Semifinal 1

Semifinal 2

Finals
The four qualifying skaters competed in Final A, while four others raced for 5th place in Final B.

Final A

Final B

References

Men's short track speed skating at the 1992 Winter Olympics